It's Only Natural is the second and final studio album released by American boy band Natural, released via Sony BMG and Transcontinental Records in Germany on March 15, 2004. The album was preceded by the release of the singles "What If", "Let Me Just Fly" and "Just One Last Dance", a collaboration with Sarah Connor. The album fared moderately, and was later released in Japan, but became the band's final album.

Background
The album became the band's second and final release, after their split was announced during their It's Only Natural Farewell Tour. It's Only Natural was a complete departure from the band's debut album, Keep It Natural, which took inspiration from manager Lou Pearlman's other boyband, O-Town. This time, the band decided to take a more mature musical direction, drawing upon a rock and pop sound similar to that of The Calling. The album also drew inspiration from Pearlman's biggest success, the Backstreet Boys.

Four singles were released from the album: "What If", released on November 10, 2003, "Let Me Just Fly", released on February 16, 2004, "Just One Last Dance", a collaboration with Sarah Connor, released on March 1, 2004, and "Why It Hurts", released on September 13, 2004. The German version of the album omits "Just One Last Dance", and also does not include "Why it Hurts", due to the fact it was recorded after the album's initial release, but before the release of the album in Japan, hence its appearance. "Just One Last Dance" also appears on the Japanese version. "Cabdriver" and "3 Miles" had been planned for released as singles, but due to band's disbandment, nothing came of them. As "Cabdriver" was recorded after the album's release, it only appeared as a B-side in Germany, but again, appears on the Japanese release. All four singles from the album appeared in the German Singles Chart top forty, despite little promotion. The album was released in Germany, Austria, Switzerland as well as Malaysia, Philippines, and Japan.

Track listing

Charts and Certifications

Singles

Release history

References

2004 albums
Natural (band) albums